Eszter Dora Békési (born 19 January 2002) is a Hungarian swimmer. She competed in the 2020 Summer Olympics.

References

2002 births
Living people
Sportspeople from Debrecen
Swimmers at the 2020 Summer Olympics
Hungarian female swimmers
Olympic swimmers of Hungary